Perušić is municipality (općina) in Lika-Senj County, Croatia. The municipality has 2,638 inhabitants, while the settlement itself has 852. The municipality is within the mountainous Lika region of central Croatia. The Kosinj valley region sprawls alongside it.

Perušić is one of the poorest inhabited municipalities in Croatia, with a shrinking population. Farming and agricultural industries are the main occupations. The small settlements of the municipality are built on hillsides due to frequent flooding.

Geography
It lies in a field, Perušićko polje, bounded by the hills west of Klis and the railway line east of the Old Town of Perušić (Stari grad Perušić  Gradina).

Perušić connects to major roadways including the D50 state road, and the Zagreb–Split motorway (A1). The main railway line M604 also connects to Zagreb and Split, with daily passenger and freight service.

History

The region has been inhabited since the ancient times. Stone Age artifacts have been found on the road to Otočac, while more finds come from the Bronze Age including grave sites from the 8th or 9th century BC. In the woods of Begovača near Kosinje there is a Roman monolith engraved with the verdict of a water dispute between Illyrian tribes. 

Perušić became an organized settlement in the 16th century, when it was on the border between the Ottoman Empire and European states. It was first called Perušić in 1487. It was founded by brothers Dominik and Gašpar Perušić, from a noble family who came from the hinterland. The family built a hill fortress, known by various names in writings of that time, including Stari grad Perušić (Old Town of Perušić), Gradina (fortified town), and most often Perušićka kula (Perušić tower).

When the Turks conquered Lika and Krbava, 1527, the fort became the main stronghold of Turkish Lika. This borderland between three empires – the Habsburg monarchy including the remains of the Croatian-Hungarian Empire, the Venetian Republic and the Ottoman Empire – was the scene of constant warfare. Liberation from the Turkish authorities in Lika began in 1685.

Until 1918, Perušić was part of the Austrian monarchy (Kingdom of Croatia-Slavonia after the Compromise of 1867), in the Croatian Military Frontier, administered by the Kommando Ottotschaner Regiment 2. From the late 19th century to the early 20th century, Perušić was part of the Lika-Krbava County of the Kingdom of Croatia-Slavonia.

During World War II, the town was occupied by Axis troops and was included into the Pavelić's Independent State of Croatia (NDH). The fascist Ustashe regime committed the Genocide of the Serbs and the Holocaust. On 6 August 1941, the Ustashe killed and burned more than 280 Serbs in Mlakva near Perušić, including 191 children.

After 1945, the forests became general state assets, administered by the District Councils. The Forestry Building in Perušić was erected in 1970.

During the Croatian War of Independence (1991–1995), Perušić was near the front lines. It was not safe even after the stabilization of the battlefield and the international recognition of Croatia as part of the European Community. In addition to artillery attacks, Serbia launched an infantry attack on 19 January 1992 which was repulsed by Croatian troops.

Population

The 18 settlements (naselja) which make up the municipality of Perušić, with their populations, are as follows:

 Bakovac Kosinjski – 126
 Bukovac Perušićki – 91
 Donji Kosinj – 494
 Gornji Kosinj – 132
 Kaluđerovac – 24
 Klenovac – 32
 Konjsko Brdo – 118
 Kosa Janjačka – 98
 Krš – 32
 Kvarte – 193
 Lipovo Polje – 122
 Malo Polje – 74
 Mezinovac – 24
 Mlakva – 51
 Perušić – 852
 Prvan Selo – 97
 Selo Sveti Marko – 34
 Studenci – 44

These settlements tend to be built on hillsides due to flooding of the Perušić field. According to the 2011 census, the municipality was primarily Croat (90.22%) and Serb (8.49%).

The population of the Municipality has fallen by more than a third between 1991 and 2011.  Reasons for this include the emigration of population to more developed areas, attacks during the War of Independence, the aging population, and frequent flooding.

Climate

The Lika region has a temperate oceanic climate with Köppen climate classification Cfb, moderately humid with a warm summer.  The Velebit mountain range restricts the thermal influence of the Adriatic Sea, but allows moist air to reach the interior resulting in high precipitation (particularly in winter and autumn). The growing season is 210–250 days, and there are 140–180 days with temperatures above .

Economy
Farming and agricultural industries are the main occupation. The nearby highway brought rapid economic development, though Perušić remains one of the poorest inhabited municipalities in Croatia.

Culture

Literature

According to historical documents, Perušić can be called the cradle of Croatian literacy. Shortly after a printing machine was invented in the nearby village of Kosinj, Missale Romanum Glagolitice (Croatian: Misal po zakonu rimskoga dvora) was printed, one of the oldest printed books in Croatia and Europe, with numerous illustrations and ornaments. It was printed in 1483, just 28 years after the Gutenberg Bible.

Sport
The local football team is NK Perušić.

Landmarks

Grabovača
Grabovača is a cave park situated between the Lika karstic plains and fields,  from the center of Perušić. In an area of  there are an abundance of underground karst forms, complex calcite formations. The park represents one-quarter of the protected caves in Croatia. The caves are closed to the public in winter.

Kosinj Bridge
Kosinj Bridge is a  stone bridge crossing the river Lika, connecting Upper and Lower Kosinj.  It was designed in the 19th century by architect Milivoj Frković, built using an early Croatian bridge-building technique known as uklinjenje kamena (clipping stone).

Kruščica
Lake Krušćica is an artificial lake and reservoir created in 1966 to help control flooding of the Lika.

References

External links
  

Municipalities of Croatia
Populated places in Lika-Senj County